Talariga is a genus of moths of the family Erebidae. The genus was erected by Francis Walker in 1858.

Species
Talariga albomaculata (Kenrick, 1917) Madagascar
Talariga capacior Walker, 1858 north-eastern Himalayas, Vietnam, Peninsular Malaysia, Singapore, Sumatra, Borneo, Java, Philippines

References

Calpinae